The Eaglehawk–Inglewood line is a disused railway line in northern Victoria, Australia. It links the Piangil line to the Manangatang and Sea Lake lines. It was opened in 1876.

Operations
The line operated using the Train Order Working system of safeworking. A crossing loop is provided at Bridgewater. The maximum speed limit is 50 km/h, with all mainline locomotives permitted, albeit with some speed restrictions. The line was booked out of service in May 2007.

Flood damage in January 2011 resulted in several sections of the track suffering ballast wash aways as well as bridge damage which has not been fixed (as of July 2018).

Sections of rail near Bridgewater have been pulled up to be reused in several Standard Gauge conversion projects in that part of Victoria.

Locations

References

Freight railway lines in Victoria (Australia)
Railway lines opened in 1876